Port Hudson is an unincorporated community in western Franklin County, in the U.S. state of Missouri. The community is on Missouri Route C and approximately two miles north of Leslie and US Route 50.

History
A post office called Port Hudson was established in 1859, and remained in operation until 1909. The community's name most likely is a transfer from Port Hudson, Louisiana.

References

Unincorporated communities in Franklin County, Missouri
Unincorporated communities in Missouri